The country of Burundi in Africa has the following national parks and other protected areas.

National parks 
 Kibira National Park
 Ruvubu National Park
 Rusizi National Park

Nature reserves 
Bururi Forest Nature Reserve
Kigwena Natural Reserve
Lake Rwihinda Natural Reserve (Lac aux Oiseaux)
Rumonge Nature Reserve
Rusizi Nature Reserve
Vyanda Forest Nature Reserve

Natural monuments 
Chutes de la Kagera (Karera Waterfalls Natural Monument)
German Gorge - Faille des Allemands

See also
 Tourism in Burundi

External links 
 World Institute for Nature and Environment

Protected
Burundi

Protected areas